IJM Corporation Berhad is one of Malaysia's leading conglomerates and is listed on the Main Market of Bursa Malaysia Securities Berhad ("Bursa Securities"). Its core business activities encompass construction, property development, manufacturing and quarrying, Infrastructure concessions and plantations. Headquartered in Selangor, Malaysia, IJM's regional aspirations have seen it establish a growing presence in neighbouring developing markets with operations presently spanning 10 countries, with primary focus in Malaysia, Singapore, Australia, United Arab Emirates, China, Indonesia and India.

Corporate Profile
The result of a merger between three medium-sized local construction companies – IGB Construction Sdn. Bhd. (Ipoh Garden Bhd.), Jurutama Sdn Bhd and Mudajaya Sdn Bhd, IJM was formed in 1983 to compete more effectively against bigger foreign rivals. The Company began to quickly establish itself as a professionally managed construction group and rapidly gained market acceptance. Over the years, the Company progressively built on its delivery capabilities, competitive prowess and financial capacity to strengthen its footing as a reputable local contractor.

In April 2007, IJM acquired the Road Builder Group ("RBH"), its nearest competitor, to augment its position as one of the country's biggest builders. In addition to bolstering its construction order book, property land bank and infrastructure portfolio, the enlarged Group enabled IJM to attain considerable synergistic benefits, greater local prominence as well as attain a more sizeable balance sheet to bid for larger jobs and facilitate its expansion into overseas markets.

IJM's undertaking as a property developer began as a natural progression from its experience in the construction business. The Group's property arm has since grown considerably. IJM Land Berhad is one of the largest property developers in Malaysia with sprawling townships, commercial buildings and high-rise condominiums under development in key growth areas throughout the country. Besides establishing itself as a reputable township developer in India, IJM has also successfully undertaken ventures overseas in the past such as in Orlando USA, Singapore and Australia.

Initially supporting in-house needs, the Group's Industry Division quickly grew its operations into scale-able core activities focused on catering to demand from outside the Group. IJM continued to expand on its operations in this division with strategic acquisitions such as the takeover of Industrial Concrete Products Berhad in 2004 and successful market diversifications into China, India and Pakistan.

Leveraging on its construction expertise, the Group also owns and operates infrastructure concessions to create long-term recurrent income streams. Initial advancements into concession assets in Malaysia, however, proved elusive and, thus, an international focus was adopted. IJM's involvement in overseas infrastructure privatisation (Build-Operate-Transfer) schemes met with considerable success. Amongst the Group's present investments in major overseas infrastructure projects are the Western Access Tollway in Argentina, five tolled highways and the Gautami power plant in India, and the Binh An water treatment concession in Vietnam. In Malaysia, the Group owns and operates three highways and port concessions from the RBH merger. The Group had previously invested in and profitably sold several infrastructure assets in China.

The Group also ventured into oil palm plantations in 1985 as a source of steady income to cushion the cyclical nature of its core construction business. This investment has since paid off handsomely. Now listed on the Main Market of Bursa Securities, IJM Plantations Berhad has contributed significantly to the Group's earnings over the years and has also accorded the Group better resilience to weather macro-economic and input costs volatilities. It is currently expanding its plantation operations into Indonesia.

When IJM went public in 1986, it had a market capitalisation of RM66 million and total assets of RM172 million. The Group's market capitalisation stood at RM9.83 billion as of 30 June 2014 and total assets stood at RM18.4 billion as of 31 March 2014.

Company history
I → IGB Construction Sdn Bhd was incorporated in 1981

J → Jurutama Sdn Bhd was incorporated in 1970 as Soon Tat Construction Sdn Bhd

M → Mudajaya Construction Sdn Bhd was incorporated in 1965 as Chye Hin Construction Co Ltd. In 1997, the name was changed to Mudajaya Corporation Berhad (a construction company of Mudajaya Group Berhad)

The founders of Jurutama and Mudajaya were professionals serving as senior government officials. Despite holding secure positions, their determination to search for that legendary 'pot of gold at the end of the rainbow' led them to break new grounds at a time when hardly any qualified engineer dared venture out as contractor.

With them at the helm, they steered Jurutama and Mudajaya through the high risk contracting business. With their perseverance and diligence to give their best, they brought new changes and professionalism to the entire Malaysian construction industry. And, by the end of the '70s, Jurutama and Mudajaya have emerged as two of the largest companies in Malaysia.
Tough times set in at the turn of the decade when the influx of large and well-capitalised foreign contractors, who had with them surplus capacity and concessionary government loans, severely affected the competitiveness of local construction companies. Local contractors were slowly being relegated to being subcontractors or minority joint venture partners.

Jurutama and Mudajaya were not spared. Their founders saw the obvious. Local companies have got to either merge, go public or come under the umbrella of larger public companies if they are to survive the challenges posed by these foreign contractors.
A meeting of former Technical College mates brought the answer. IGB Corporation Bhd, a public listed property company which then owned a small building construction subsidiary, saw the synergies that a combination of IGB Construction, Jurutama and Mudajaya could bring to the Group. In 1982, in a friendly takeover, IGB Corporation Bhd acquired all the shares in Jurutama and Mudajaya.
Following this acquisition, Solidstate Sdn Bhd was incorporated (1983) and, in 1984, the name was changed to IJM Engineering and Construction Sdn Bhd. IGB then transferred all its equity interests in Jurutama and Mudajaya together with that of IGB Construction in exchange for shares in this newly incorporated company. IJM had thus become IGB's holding company for its construction interests.
In 1986, IJM turned public. An application made for its shares to be listed on the Bursa Malaysia Securities Berhad was subsequently obtained in September 1986.

To better reflect the Group's diversified nature of activities, the present logo and a new name, IJM Corporation Berhad, was adopted in 1989.

Subsidiaries

Construction
 IJM Construction Sdn Bhd
 Road Builder (M) Sdn Bhd
 Jurutama Sdn Bhd
 Commerce House Sdn Bhd
 GR Commerce Sdn Bhd
 IJM (India) Geotechniques Private Limited
 IJM (India) Infrastructure Limited
 IJM Building Systems Sdn Bhd
 IJM Construction (Middle East) Limited Liability Company
 IJM Construction International Limited Liability Company
 Insitu Envirotech (M) Sdn Bhd
 Insitu Envirotech (S.E. Asia) Pte Ltd
 Insitu Envirotech Pte Ltd
 Nilai Cipta Sdn Bhd
 Prebore Piling & Engineering Sdn Bhd

Properties
 IJM Land Berhad 
 IJM Properties Sdn Bhd
 IJM RE Sdn Bhd
 Aqua Aspect Sdn Bhd
 Aras Varia Sdn Bhd 
 Bukit Bendera Resort Sdn Bhd 
 Casa Warna Sdn Bhd 
 Chen Yu Land Sdn Bhd
 Delta Awana Sdn Bhd 
 Dian Warna Sdn Bhd 
 Emko Management Services Sdn Bhd 
 Emko Properties Sdn Bhd 
 ERMS Berhad 
 IJM Australia Pty Limited
 IJM Lingamaneni Township Private Limited 
 IJM Management Services Sdn Bhd
 Liberty Heritage (M) Sdn Bhd
 Manda’rina (M) Sdn Bhd 
 NPE Property Development Sdn Bhd
 NS Central Market Sdn Bhd
 Pilihan Alam Jaya Sdn Bhd 
 RB Development Sdn Bhd 
 RB Land Sdn Bhd 
 RB Property Management Sdn Bhd 
 Seremban Two Holdings Sdn Bhd 
 Seremban Two Landscape Sdn Bhd 
 Seremban Two Properties Sdn Bhd 
 Seremban Two Property Management Sdn Bhd 
 Serenity Ace Sdn Bhd 
 Shah Alam 2 Sdn Bhd 
 Sinaran Intisari (M) Sdn Bhd 
 Suria Bistari Development Sdn Bhd
 Swarnandhra-IJMII Integrated Township Development Company Private Limited
 Titian Tegas Sdn Bhd 
 Unggul Senja Sdn Bhd 
 Worldwide Ventures Sdn Bhd

Industries
 Industrial Concrete Products Sdn Bhd
 Malaysian Rock Products Sdn Bhd 
 Aggregate Marketing Sdn Bhd 
 Azam Ekuiti Sdn Bhd 
 Concrete Mould Engineering Sdn Bhd
 Durabon Sdn Bhd 
 Expedient Resources Sdn Bhd 
 Global Rock Marketing Sdn Bhd
 ICP Investment (L) Limited 
 ICP Jiangmen Co. Ltd
 ICP Marketing Sdn Bhd 
 ICPB (Mauritius) Limited 
 IJM Concrete Products Pakistan (Private) Ltd
 IJM Concrete Products Private Limited
 Kamad Quarry Sdn Bhd 
 Kemena Industries Sdn Bhd
 Kuang Rock Products Sdn Bhd 
 Oriental Empire Sdn Bhd 
 Scaffold Master Sdn Bhd 
 Strong Mixed Concrete Sdn Bhd
 Tadmansori Rubber Industries Sdn Bhd 
 Ubon Steel Sdn Bhd

Plantations
 IJM Plantations Berhad
 Akrab Perkasa Sdn Bhd 
 Ampas Maju Sdn Bhd 
 Berakan Maju Sdn Bhd 
 Desa Talisai Palm Oil Mill Sdn Bhd 
 Desa Talisai Sdn Bhd
 Cahaya Adil Sdn Bhd 
 Firdana Corporation Sdn Bhd 
 Gerbang Selasih Sdn Bhd 
 Excellent Challenger (M) Sdn Bhd 
 Gapas Mewah Sdn Bhd
 Golden Grip Sdn Bhd 
 Gunaria Sdn Bhd 
 IJM Agri Services Sdn Bhd 
 IJM Edible Oils Sdn Bhd 
 Kulim Mewah Sdn Bhd 
 Laserline Sdn Bhd  
 Minat Teguh Sdn Bhd 
 Rakanan Jaya Sdn Bhd 
 Rantajasa Sdn Bhd 
 Ratus Sempurna Sdn Bhd
 RB Plantations Sdn Bhd 
 Sabang Mills Sdn Bhd 
 Sijas Plantations Sdn Bhd 
 Sri Kilau Sdn Bhd

Infrastructure

Toll operators
 Besraya Sdn Bhd ( Sungai Besi Expressway)
 New Pantai Expressway Sdn Bhd ( New Pantai Expressway)
 Lebuhraya Kajang-Seremban Sdn Bhd ( Kajang–Seremban Highway)
 Jaipur – Mahua Tollway Private Limited
 RB Highway Services Sdn Bhd 
 Rewa Tollway Private Limited 
 Roadstar (India) Infrastructure Private Limited 
 Sukma Samudra Sdn Bhd
 Swarnandhra Road Care Private Limited

Port operators
 Konsortium Pelabuhan Kemaman Sdn Bhd (Kemaman Port)
 Kuantan Port Consortium Sdn Bhd (Kuantan Port)
 KP Port Services Sdn Bhd

Others
 Essmarine Terminal Sdn Bhd 
 IEMCEE Infra (Mauritius) Limited 
 IJM International Limited
 IJM Investments (L) Ltd
 IJM Investments (M) Limited
 IJM Overseas Ventures Sdn Bhd 
 IJM Rajasthan (Mauritius) Limited 
 IJM Rewa (Mauritius) Limited 
 IJM Trichy (Mauritius) Limited
 IJMII (Mauritius) Limited

External links
IJM Corporation Berhad Official site
IJM Land – Malaysia Property Developer

References 

1983 establishments in Malaysia
Conglomerate companies of Malaysia
Companies based in Petaling Jaya
Holding companies established in 1983
Malaysian companies established in 1983
Construction and civil engineering companies of Malaysia
Companies listed on Bursa Malaysia
Construction and civil engineering companies established in 1983